Itaigara is a neighbourhood located in the southeastern zone of Salvador, Bahia.

Owes its name to the indigenous origin and means "of stone canoe" (Ita: "stone"; Igaram: "boat" or "water lady").

Surrounded by trees, modern and luxurious buildings, in addition to extensive fields, the Itaigara has shopping malls, companies, laboratories, bars, supermarkets and schools. It is entoured by the neighbourhoods of Pituba, Caminho das Árvores, Brotas and Santa Cruz

Neighbourhoods in Salvador, Bahia